Sebastián Uprimny (born 30 June 1975) is a Colombian cross-country skier. He competed in the 2018 Winter Olympics.

References

1975 births
Living people
Cross-country skiers at the 2018 Winter Olympics
Colombian male cross-country skiers
Olympic cross-country skiers of Colombia